Vampireology: The True History of the Fallen Ones is a fantasy book about vampires, created and published by Templar Publishing in the United Kingdom on May 11, 2010. It was published by Candlewick Press in the United States under the title Vampireology: The True History of the Fallen. The book is marketed as having been written by vampire-slayer/Protector Archibald Brooks, and is the ninth book in the Ologies series.

Plot 
The book purports to have been written in 1900 by Archibald Brooks, the main "Protector" (vampire slayer). Brooks sent a telegram to Joshua T. Kraik, a private investigator and his friend asking him to come to his office and, should he arrive too late, to look in the casket. Brooks was killed on the night of May 10, 1920, at his office in the British Museum. The next day, Joshua went to see his friend, and, when he did, he searched Brooks' office and found the book. He took a look in it to see that Brooks had planned for him to have it so Joshua took it home with him. When he started reading the book, he found he was to be the next Protector, so he read on, taking all the information very seriously. He saw everything about the original three Fallen ones and their bloodlines.

Moloch, the destroyer, whose bloodline kills for pleasure. Ba'al, the deceiver, whose bloodline has the powers of mind control. And Belial, the tortured, whose bloodline carries their ancestors' guilt over Belial's decision to rebel against Heaven. Belials can also feel the emotions that a normal person can, but are still compelled to feed on humans.

He added notes while he read through the book; things like how he is getting on, a little bit of personal life, drawings, bits of newspaper, his feelings about the book, drafts and letters.

On May 14, 1920, he gets a letter from a strange woman living in Venice that said she and Brooks used to be close acquaintances and that Brooks had once promised her the book. Joshua didn't believe her, but he wrote back saying that he can't pass on the book yet but they should keep in touch. A few more letters and drafts later, he decides to visit her in Venice. While he is reading the book at his hotel he gets another letter, this one is short and straightforward and in Joshua's note he describes how terrifying it is and how a part of him always sensed that she was not what she seemed to be.

On the last page, hidden away is a letter addressed to Joshua. He tells Joshua to destroy her with the Sword of Angels (Archangel Michael's sword that he used to defeat the three original Fallen Ones, Moloch, Ba'al and Belial. It is the only sword that can destroy the Fallen Ones). Brooks sheds some light on the mysterious Venice lady. Joshua leaves a note and two newspaper clippings. One reports the murder of another one of Joshua's friends and the other reports the burning of a palazzo in Venice which suggests victory for Joshua in his first task as a Protector.

The book ends here.

Film adaptation
On January 31, 2018, Paramount Pictures announced they were in the process of developing a film franchise centered around all 13 Ology books, by setting up a writers room currently consisting of Jeff Pinkner, Michael Chabon, Lindsey Beer, Joe Robert Cole, Nicole Perlman and Christina Hodson. The vision for the franchise is the hope that each of the writers will embrace the books by working with visual artists to create treatments which will eventually evolve into seven movie scripts with interconnected stories. Paramount also announced that Akiva Goldsman will act as overseer and producer of the franchise.

References

External links
Vampireology: The True History of the Fallen Ones

2010 children's books
Books by Dugald Steer
Candlewick Press books
Children's fiction books
British children's books
Vampire novels